is a Japanese band of the 1980s and 1990s. Led by Kōryū, the band also features female singers Satoko Nishikawa and Emi Shirasaki. The SST sound is a blend of Okinawan music, min'yo singing and other Japanese elements, with some rock, pop and reggae thrown in. The unique sound of the group is largely due to an original instrument devised by Kōryū that he calls "sangen"; a banjo strung with shamisen strings.

In 1990 Shang Shang Typhoon signed with the Epic/Sony label, but more recently they have recorded on independent labels. In 1994, they did the song "Itsumo dareka ga" for the Studio Ghibli film Pom Poko.

On 1 February 2013 at the official Shang Shang Typhoon website, the band announced an indefinite hiatus due to the health of band leader Kōryū.

Members

Discography

Video
 Begara Shagara Live Akogare (1992); Epic Sony
 Shang Shang Buri (2004); M and I Inc. (Pony Canyon Japan)

References

  Nippop Artist Site

External links
 Shang Shang Typhoon Official Site (in Japanese and English)

Japanese pop music groups
Musical groups from Kanagawa Prefecture